is a metro station on the Osaka Metro Sakaisuji Line in Kita-ku, Osaka, Osaka Prefecture, Japan.

Layout
There are two side platforms with two tracks on the second basement.

Surroundings
 Temma Station (Osaka Loop Line)
 Kita Ward Office, Osaka
 Tenjimbashisuji Shopping Arcade
 Kids Plaza Osaka
 Kansai Telecasting Corporation

Buses
Ōgimachi (Osaka City Bus)
Route 37 for Itakano Shako-mae / for Osaka-ekimae (Osaka Station north side)
Route 83 for Hanahaku-kinen-koen kitaguchi / for Osaka-ekimae (Osaka Station north side)
Route 78 for Moriguchi Shako-mae / for Osaka-ekimae (Osaka Station north side)

Stations next to Ogimachi

External links
  Ogimachi Station from Osaka Metro website
  Ogimachi Station from Osaka Metro website

Railway stations in Osaka Prefecture
Railway stations in Japan opened in 1969
Osaka Metro stations